The National University of Technology (NUTECH) is a public university located in Islamabad, Pakistan. It was established in 2018.

Programs
The university offers the following degree programs:

 BS Electrical Engineering
 BS Mechanical Engineering
 BS Civil Engineering
 BS Computer Engineering
 BS Computer Science
 BS Artificial Intelligence
 BS Civil Engineering Technology
 BS Biology 
 BS Chemistry

See also
List of engineering universities and colleges in Pakistan

References

External links
 NUTECH official website

2018 establishments in Pakistan
Public universities and colleges in Pakistan
Educational institutions established in 2018
Engineering universities and colleges in Pakistan
Pakistan Army universities and colleges